Zikir Muhammadjonov (1921 – 23 August 2012) was a Soviet and Uzbek theater and film actor. People's Artist of the USSR (1977). Laureate of the USSR State Prize (1977). He is recognized as People's Artist of Uzbekistan.

Biography 
Zikir Muhammadjonov was born on 1 January (according to other sources – 14 August) 1921 in Tashkent. He played on the stage of the school amateur theater, where he played all the main roles. Since 1938 he was an actor of the  named after Hamza. He worked in the theater until his last days. He played over three hundred roles, including Ulugh Beg, Abu-Reyhan Biruni, Ali-Shir Nava'i, Husayn Bayqarah, Amir Temur. The war prevented him from starting his studies, during which (1941–1943) he worked at an aircraft factory, in Tashkent, where he mastered plumbing.

Muhammadjonov graduated from the Tashkent State Institute of Theater Arts named after I. A. N. Ostrovsky in 1949. He studied during the day, worked in the theater in the evening.

Muhammadjonov began appearing in films from 1956, and has starred in more than 40 films. He dubbed a large number of films for the "Uzbekfilm" studio. He was a member of the Union of Cinematographers of the Uzbek SSR.

Family 
Muhammadjonov lived with his wife for 70 years. He had five sons, and a daughter Feruza (deceased), as well as 17 grandchildren.

Filmography

Awards 
 Hero of Uzbekistan (2003)
  (1956)
  (1964)
 People's Artist of the USSR (1977)
 USSR State Prize (1977) — for playing the role of Lenin in the performance "Dawn of the Revolution"
  (1986)
 Order of Lenin (1986)
 Two Orders of the Red Banner of Labor (1970, 1975)
  Uzbekistan (1994)
 Order of Outstanding Merit Uzbekistan (1998)
  (1991)

References

External links
 

1921 births
2012 deaths
Actors from Tashkent
People's Artists of the USSR
Recipients of the USSR State Prize
Recipients of the Order of Lenin
Recipients of the Order of the Red Banner of Labour
Soviet male actors